Aksel Lund Svindal (born 26 December 1982) is a Norwegian former World Cup alpine ski racer.

Born in Lørenskog in Akershus county, Svindal is a two-time overall World Cup champion (2007 and 2009), an Olympic gold medalist in super-G at the 2010 Winter Olympics and in downhill at the 2018 Winter Olympics, and a five-time World Champion in downhill, giant slalom, and super combined (2007 Åre, 2009 Val-d'Isère, 2011 Garmisch, and 2013 Schladming).  With his victory in the downhill in 2013, Svindal became the first male alpine racer to win titles in four consecutive world championships.

With his successes many consider him the best Norwegian alpine skier ever.  While the great Kjetil Andre Aamodt has been more successful at the Olympics, Svindal is by far the most successful on the World Cup circuit.

In late-January 2019, he announced his retirement from alpine skiing following the 2019 Ski World Championships.

Career
During his career, Svindal won nine World Championship medals, four Olympic medals (two of them gold), two overall World Cup and nine discipline titles (in downhill, super-G, giant slalom, and combined), and 36 World Cup races. Additionally, he won four medals at the World Junior Championships in 2002, including gold in combined.

On 27 November 2007, during the first training run for the Birds of Prey downhill race in Beaver Creek, Colorado, Svindal crashed badly after landing a jump. He somersaulted into a safety fence and was taken to Vail Valley Medical Center (now Vail Health Hospital) with broken bones in his face and a six-inch (15 cm) laceration to his groin and abdominal area. Svindal missed the remainder of the 2008 season, and returned to World Cup racing in October 2008. His first two victories following his return were a downhill and a super-G in Beaver Creek, on the same Birds of Prey course where he was injured the year before.

At the 2009 World Championships, Svindal won the gold in the super combined. Completing his comeback during the 2009 season, Svindal won his second overall World Cup over Benjamin Raich of Austria. Entering the last race of the season, a slalom at the World Cup finals in Åre, Sweden, Svindal led Raich by just two points. They had won the two previous races (a downhill and giant slalom respectively), with Svindal leading but Raich was the favourite as a specialist in slalom. Both skiers went off course and did not finish the slalom, so the Norwegian became the overall World Cup winner. He also won his fourth discipline title, his second in super G.

At the 2010 Winter Olympics on 15 February, Svindal won the silver medal in the downhill competition in Whistler, 0.07 seconds behind the winner, Didier Défago of Switzerland, and 0.02 seconds ahead of bronze medalist Bode Miller of the United States. Svindal's medal was Norway's hundredth silver medal at the Winter Olympics, the most for any nation.

Four days later on 19 February, Svindal won the super-G, his first-ever Olympic gold medal – ahead of Miller (+ 0.28 seconds) and Andrew Weibrecht (+ 0.31 seconds), both of the U.S.

Svindal successfully defended his world title in the super combined in 2011 at Garmish-Partenkirchen, Germany.

After an Achilles tendon injury in October 2014, Svindal did not compete in World Cup events during the 2015 season. He did enter the World Championships in Colorado in February, and placed sixth in both the downhill and super-G events.

After his season long injury, Svindal had a very strong start to the 2016 season. He managed seven world cup victories before he sustained a season-ending knee injury under tough conditions in Kitzbühel, Austria.

After a fairly good start to the 2016–2017 season including 1 World Cup win, for the third straight season he suffered a season ending/interrupting injury, and this time missed both the majority of the World Cup season and the 2017 World Alpine Ski Championships.

He won another Olympic Gold in the downhill event at the 2018 Winter Olympics, becoming the oldest ever Alpine skiing gold medallist.

In his final race, the downhill at the 2019 World Alpine Ski Championships in Åre in February of that year, Svindal finished second in a Norwegian one-two, being pipped to the gold by team-mate Kjetil Jansrud by a margin of two hundredths of a second.

Personal life
Svindal dated alpine racer Julia Mancuso of the U.S. for three years, until the couple split up in September 2013.

In his spare time, he devotes himself to freeskiing, and has already appeared in several freeskiing film documentaries.

One of his best friends is his teammate Kjetil Jansrud.

World Cup results

Season titles
11 titles: (2 overall, 2 Downhill, 5 Super-G, 1 Giant slalom, 1 Combined)

Season standings

Race victories
36 wins – (14 DH, 17 SG, 4 GS, 1 SC)

World Championship results

Olympic results

References

External links

 
 Aksel Lund Svindal World Cup standings at the International Ski Federation
 
 
 
 Norwegian Ski Team – alpine skiing – Aksel Lund Svindal – 
 Head Skis – teams – Aksel Lund Svindal
  – 

1982 births
Living people
People from Skedsmo
People from Lørenskog
Norwegian male alpine skiers
Alpine skiers at the 2006 Winter Olympics
Alpine skiers at the 2010 Winter Olympics
Alpine skiers at the 2014 Winter Olympics
Alpine skiers at the 2018 Winter Olympics
Olympic alpine skiers of Norway
Medalists at the 2010 Winter Olympics
Medalists at the 2018 Winter Olympics
Olympic medalists in alpine skiing
Olympic gold medalists for Norway
Olympic silver medalists for Norway
Olympic bronze medalists for Norway
FIS Alpine Ski World Cup champions
Audi Sport TT Cup drivers
Sportspeople from Viken (county)
World Rallycross Championship drivers
Norwegian racing drivers